Morocco competed at the 2020 Summer Olympics in Tokyo. Originally scheduled to take place during the summer of 2020, the Games were postponed to 23 July to 8 August 2021, because of the COVID-19 pandemic. It was the nation's fifteenth appearance at the Summer Olympics.

Medalists

Competitors
The following is a list of the number of Moroccan competitors in the Games.

Athletics
 
Moroccan athletes achieved the entry standards, either by qualifying time or by world ranking, in the following track and field events (up to a maximum of 3 athletes in each event):

Track & road events
Men

Women

Boxing

Morocco qualified six boxers (three per gender) into the Olympic tournament. Rio 2016 Olympian Khadija El-Mardi, along with five rookies (Baala, Nadir, Assaghir, Cheddar, and Bel Ahbib), secured their spots by advancing to the final match of their respective weight divisions at the 2020 African Qualification Tournament in Diamniadio, Senegal. El-Mardi later withdrew prior to the start of the competition.

Men

Women

Canoeing

Slalom
Moroccan canoeists qualified one boat for each of the following classes through the 2021 African Canoe Slalom Championship in La Seu d'Urgell, Spain.

Cycling

Road
Morocco entered one rider to compete in the men's Olympic road race, by virtue of his top 50 national finish (for men) in the UCI World Ranking.

Equestrian

Morocco entered one dressage rider into the Olympic equestrian competition, by finishing in the top two, outside the group selection, of the individual FEI Olympic Rankings for Group F (Africa and Middle East). Meanwhile, a squad of three jumping riders was added to the Moroccan roster by accepting a forfeited spot from Qatar, as the next highest-ranked team, not yet qualified, at the International Equestrian Federation (FEI)-designated Olympic qualifier for Group F in Rabat.

Dressage

Qualification Legend: Q = Qualified for the final; q = Qualified for the final as a lucky loser

Jumping
Samy Colman and Davino Q withdrew before the competition as Colman tested positive to COVID-19 and was replaced by El Ghali Boukaa and Ugolino du Clos. Ali Al-Ahrach's Golden Lady is the reserve horse.

Fencing

Morocco entered one fencer into the Olympic competition. Houssam El-Kord claimed a spot in the men's épée as the top-ranked fencer vying for qualification from Africa in the FIE Adjusted Official Rankings.

Golf 

Morocco entered one golfer into the Olympic tournament. Maha Haddioui (world no. 418) qualified directly among the top 60 eligible players for the women's event based on the IGF World Rankings as of 29 July 2021.

Judo

Morocco qualified two female judoka for each of the following weight classes at the Games. Rio 2016 Olympian Assmaa Niang was selected among the top 18 judoka of the women's middleweight category (70 kg) based on the IJF World Ranking List of June 28, 2021, while rookie Soumiya Iraoui (women's half-lightweight, 52 kg) accepted a continental berth from Africa as the nation's top-ranked judoka outside of direct qualifying position.

Karate
 
Morocco entered one karateka into the inaugural Olympic tournament. Btissam Sadini qualified directly for the women's kumite 61-kg category by topping the final pool round at 2021 World Olympic Qualification Tournament in Paris, France.

Kumite

Rowing

Morocco qualified one boat in the women's single sculls for the Games by finishing fourth in the A-final and securing the second of five berths available at the 2019 FISA African Olympic Qualification Regatta in Tunis, Tunisia, marking the country's debut in the sport.

Qualification Legend: FA=Final A (medal); FB=Final B (non-medal); FC=Final C (non-medal); FD=Final D (non-medal); FE=Final E (non-medal); FF=Final F (non-medal); SA/B=Semifinals A/B; SC/D=Semifinals C/D; SE/F=Semifinals E/F; QF=Quarterfinals; R=Repechage

Shooting

Moroccan shooters achieved quota places for the following events by virtue of their best finishes at the 2018 ISSF World Championships, the 2019 ISSF World Cup series, and African Championships, as long as they obtained a minimum qualifying score (MQS) by May 31, 2020.

Surfing

Morocco sent one surfer to compete in the men's shortboard at the Games. Ramzi Boukhiam secured a qualification slot for his nation, as the highest-ranked and last remaining surfer from Africa, at the 2019 ISA World Surfing Games in Miyazaki, Japan.

Swimming

Morocco received a universality invitation from FINA to send two top-ranked swimmers (one per gender) in their respective individual events to the Olympics, based on the FINA Points System of June 28, 2021.

Taekwondo

Morocco entered three athletes into the taekwondo competition at the Games. Achraf Mahboubi, Oumaima El-Bouchti, and Nada Laaraj secured the spots on the Moroccan squad with a top two finish each in the men's welterweight (80 kg), women's flyweight (49 kg), and women's lightweight category (57 kg), respectively, at the 2020 African Qualification Tournament in Rabat.

Triathlon

Morocco entered one triathlete to compete at the Olympics for the first time in history. Mehdi Essadiq topped the field of triathletes vying for qualification from Africa in the men's event based on the individual ITU World Rankings of 15 June 2021.

Individual

Volleyball

Beach
Morocco men's beach volleyball team qualified directly for the Olympics by winning the gold medal at the 2018–2020 CAVB Continental Cup Final in Agadir.

Weightlifting

Morocco entered one male weightlifter into the Olympic competition. Abderrahim Moum topped the list of weightlifters from Africa in the men's 73 kg category based on the IWF Absolute Continental Rankings.

Wrestling

Morocco qualified one wrestler for the men's Greco-Roman 77 kg into the Olympic competition, by progressing to the top two finals at the 2021 African & Oceania Qualification Tournament in Hammamet, Tunisia.

Greco-Roman

References

Nations at the 2020 Summer Olympics
2020
2021 in Moroccan sport